Shangri-La (Tibetan: Gyalthang) is a county-level city in Northwestern Yunnan Province, People's Republic of China and is the location of the seat of the Dêqên Tibetan Autonomous Prefecture, bordering Sichuan to the northwest, north, and east.

Name
Shangri-La was formerly called Zhongdian County but was renamed on 17 December 2001 and upgraded into a county-level city on 16 December 2014 as Shangri-La (other spellings: Semkyi'nyida, Xianggelila, or Xamgyi'nyilha) after the fictional land of Shangri-La in the 1933 James Hilton novel Lost Horizon, in an effort to promote tourism in the area. Formerly, the Tibetan population referred to the city by its traditional name Gyalthang or Gyaitang (Wylie: rgyal thang, ZWPY: Gyaitang), meaning "Royal plains". The Chinese name of the county seat, Jiantang, reflects the pronunciation of Gyalthang.

In the early morning of January 11, 2014, a fire broke out in the 1,000-year-old Dukezong Tibetan neighborhood. About 242 homes and shops were destroyed and 2,600 residents were displaced.
About half of the old town was destroyed by the fire, half was spared. After the fire residents were allowed back to their homes and shops. By the end of 2014 rebuilding had started and tourism started to come back. Generally tourism was not affected by the fire, since the main sights in the old town, such as the prayer wheel and temples were not damaged. Many of the other main sights are located outside of the old town.

Demographics and languages

The southern half of the city is inhabited by the Naxi people, who speak the Naxi language, a Lolo-Burmese language separate from the Tibetic languages. The northern half is inhabited by the Khampas, who speak the southern variety of Khams Tibetan. Southwestern Mandarin is spoken by the Han Chinese throughout the city.

Administrative divisions
Shangri-La City has 4 towns, 6 townships and 1 ethnic township. 
4 towns

6 townships

1 ethnic township
 Sanba Naxi Ethnic Township

Climate
Except during the summer, nights are usually sharply cooler than the days. Despite the dryness of the winter, the small amount of precipitation is generally sufficient to cause major transportation dislocations and isolate the area between November and March.

National park 

 Pudacuo National Park, the first national park in China to meet IUCN standards, is part of the Three Parallel Rivers of Yunnan Protected Areas World Heritage Site.

Transport 
 The city's airport is Diqing Shangri-La Airport. Covering an area of 225 hectares, it is one of the biggest airports in the northwest of Yunnan. There are flights to Kunming, Chengdu, Lhasa, Guangzhou and Shenzhen.
 Since there is no railway available in Shangri-la, taking a long-distance bus is also a major means to get to Shangri-la besides flight. It takes about four hours to get to Shangri-la from Lijiang by bus. Tourists who rent a car for the trip can also visit the Tiger Leaping Gorge and the First Bend of Yangtze River on the way. The Lijiang–Shangri-La railway is under construction and estimated to be completed in 2020.
 Many travelers use the county town as a gateway into Tibet, either travelling many days overland by jeep to Lhasa, or by flying from the city's airport.  However, the town itself is a tourist destination, primarily due to the nearby Gandan Sumtseling Monastery, Ganden Sumtsen Ling,  Sōngzànlín Sì), Pudacuo National Park, and Tiger Leaping Gorge.
 China National Highway 214

See also 
 Shangri-La
 Shangri-La Beer
 Three Parallel Rivers of Yunnan Protected Areas - UNESCO World Heritage Site

References

Further reading 
 Forbes, Andrew ; Henley, David (2011). China's Ancient Tea Horse Road. Chiang Mai: Cognoscenti Books. ASIN: B005DQV7Q2
 Holas, Ashild. "Tourism and Tibetan Culture in Transition: A Place Called Shangrila" (Routledge Contemporary China Series). Routledge, September 12, 2007. , 9788173871092.

External links 

 Shangri-La City Official Website

County-level divisions of Dêqên Tibetan Autonomous Prefecture
Tourism in Yunnan
Shangri-La
Cities in Yunnan